Marske is a railway station on the Tees Valley Line, which runs between  and  via . It is owned by Network Rail and managed by Northern Trains.

History
The railway station is the oldest in the village of Marske-by-the-Sea. The other station, Longbeck, was built in the 1980s. The station was also mentioned in George Bradshaw's 1863 railway guide.

Facilities
Station facilities here have been improved. The package for this station included new fully lit waiting shelters, renewed station signage and the installation of CCTV. The long-line Public Address system (PA) has been renewed and upgraded with pre-recorded train announcements.

Services

As of the May 2021 timetable change, the station is served by two trains per hour between Saltburn and Darlington via Middlesbrough, with one train per hour extending to Bishop Auckland. An hourly service operates between Saltburn and Bishop Auckland on Sunday. All services are operated by Northern Trains. The first westbound train of the day runs to Carlisle rather than Bishop Auckland.

Rolling stock used: Class 156 Super Sprinter and Class 158 Express Sprinter

References

External links
 
 

Railway stations in Redcar and Cleveland
DfT Category F2 stations
Former North Eastern Railway (UK) stations
Railway stations in Great Britain opened in 1861
Northern franchise railway stations
1861 establishments in England